Ultra-Humanite is a supervillain appearing in American comic books published by DC Comics. He first appeared as a recurring adversary of Superman, and was among the first villains faced by him. He was designed to be the polar opposite of Superman; while Superman is a hero with superhuman strength, Ultra-Humanite is a criminal mastermind who has a crippled body but a highly advanced intellect. The Ultra-Humanite served as Superman's nemesis until Alexei Luthor and his Silver Age counterpart Lex Luthor were introduced in the comics. The origins of the super-criminal known as the Ultra-Humanite are shrouded in mystery. Even he claims not to remember his true name or appearance and attributes his vast intellect and mental prowess to scientific experiments of an unknown nature.

Ultra-Humanite appeared in the third and final season of The CW network television series Stargirl.

Publication history
Ultra-Humanite first appeared in Action Comics #13 (June 1939) and was created by Jerry Siegel and Joe Shuster.

Fictional character history

Golden Age

A fiendish "mad scientist", he is paralyzed from the waist down and confined to a wheelchair. His "great goal" is the "domination of the Earth". Portrayed as nearly bald in two texts and as completely bald in two others, he is a "mental giant" and the "head of a vast ring of evil enterprises" whose "fiery eyes burn with terrible hatred and sinister intelligence". His real name is never given, but he has been known as the Ultra-Humanite (Ultra, for short) ever since "a scientific experiment resulted in [his] possessing the most agile and learned brain on Earth!"

"--Unfortunately for mankind", proclaims the villain, "I prefer to use this great intellect for crime. My goal? DOMINATION OF THE WORLD!!"

Superman sets out to smash the so-called Cab Protective League, an underworld organization headed by a racketeer named Jackie Reynolds, which is attempting to seize control of the city's lucrative taxi trade. Reynolds' union, financed by the Ultra-Humanite, intimidates other cab drivers through violence and threats against passengers. Apprehended by Superman, Reynolds is convicted and sentenced to Sing Sing penitentiary. Reynolds escapes by using a cigarette that emits "a mysterious gas" that renders his guards unconscious. Superman tracks Reynolds to his secluded cabin hideout and is about to take him into custody when his attention is called to a second figure in the cabin, a "paralyzed cripple" whose "fiery eyes... burn with a terrible hatred and sinister intelligence": the Ultra-Humanite.

Ultra deals Superman electricity sufficient "to kill five hundred men", and Superman lapses into unconsciousness. With Superman now helpless, Reynolds and the Ultra-Humanite attempt to kill him with a buzz saw, but Superman's invulnerable skin obliterated the saw into tiny pieces. Reynolds is killed by one of the flying pieces. Ultra's henchmen set fire to the cabin and leave Superman behind to perish. The Ultra-Humanite is carried outside to a waiting aircraft. Superman regains consciousness and deliberately crashes into the plane. The Man of Steel is unable to find the Ultra-Humanite's body.

After scores of subway riders are injured in the collapse of a subway tunnel, Superman discovers that Star, Inc., the firm that built the tunnel, defrauded the city by using substandard materials. Superman pursues some of the criminals who lead him to the Ultra-Humanite. As Superman barges headlong into the shed, the villain freezes him inside a block of crystal. Superman is able to break out and stop the villain's plans.

The Ultra-Humanite tries to extort millions of dollars from a cruise line, but again is foiled by Superman even though Ultra uses some kind of hologram of himself to escape capture.

A mysterious epidemic sweeps through the city, killing hundreds. A young scientist, Professor Henry Travers, concocts an antidote. Ultra kidnaps Travers, but he is rescued by Superman. Ultra's henchmen fire an unknown ray and knock out Superman. Ultra tries hypnotizing him by placing a helmet on his head, but Superman fakes being controlled, and when he is taken to spread the plague with a henchman, he destroys the "fantastic airship of Ultra's creation" that was spreading its "cargo of Purple Death". Superman returns to Ultra's stronghold where the villain tries to blast him, but Superman places the Ultra-Humanite in front of the gun, killing him.

In the next issue, Superman learns that Ultra's assistant temporarily revived him "via adrenalin". Ultra orders his henchmen to kidnap actress Dolores Winters and transplant his brain into her body. As Dolores, the Ultra-Humanite announces her retirement from acting, and throws a retirement party on her yacht, The Sea-Serpent. When the party is in full swing, she moves the yacht out to sea, and her henchmen hold her guests at gunpoint. Ultra announces via ship's radio that she is holding the celebrities captive for $5 million. Dolores places helmets on the heads of the captives, wired to a control board where she can electrocute them. Despite receiving the ransom money, she still decides to kill the captives. Superman throws a huge stalagmite into the switchboard, breaking the electrical connection, and tries to capture Dolores. She waves a lighted torch in front of the captives and Superman, seeing the mad look in her eyes, realizes she is Ultra. After Superman extinguishes the torch, Dolores dives into the water and escapes.

Soon after, the Ultra-Humanite reads of the discovery of an atomic weapon created by physicist Terry Curtis. As Dolores, the villain seduces and kidnaps the scientist. After extended torture, Curtis agrees to help the Ultra-Humanite build an atomic arsenal. The Ultra-Humanite tells the city she wants $2 million or she will destroy every building and life in the city. As a demonstration, she promises to destroy the Wentworth Tower that afternoon. When an airship attacks the Tower, Superman holds the Tower up long enough to let the spectators escape. Superman destroys the disintegrator and follows the plane to the criminal lair, which is a city inside a volcano, and defeats the robot guards. Inside, the villain threatens to destroy Metropolis if Superman moves closer. In exchange for the release of Curtis, the Ultra-Humanite sends Superman to steal crown jewels, expecting him to be destroyed by the guards as she alerts them. Superman is able to battle past the guards and get the jewels. When Superman returns with the jewels, the Ultra-Humanite sends diamond drills at Superman, but Superman breaks past them. Curtis stops Ultra from pulling the lever that will destroy the city. Superman then disintegrates the photoelectric cell connections. Confronted again with her ultimate foe, the Ultra-Humanite dives to her apparent doom in the volcano's crater.

The Ultra-Humanite made his last Superman appearance in Action Comics #21 (1940), where he apparently dies, and made no further comic book appearances for several decades. He was subsequently replaced as Superman's archvillan by Lex Luthor who would be introduced in Action Comics #23 (1940).

Silver Age and the Multiverse
With the introduction of DC's multiverse system, the continuity of Golden Age Superman stories and the Ultra-Humanite were retroactively placed on Earth-Two, the Earth of DC's Golden Age characters. The Ultra-Humanite was reintroduced during the Silver Age as a recurring villain in the "Mr. and Mrs. Superman" feature in the Superman Family anthology comic. The feature consists of stories about the early years of the marriage between the Earth-Two Superman and Lois Lane. These stories feature a number of Golden Age Superman villains of which the Ultra-Humanite is the most prominent.

In the annual JLA/JSA teamup in Justice League of America #195-197 (1981), the Ultra-Humanite transfers his consciousness to an albino gorilla body and becomes a major super-villain on Earth-Two. In one instance, he recruited Brain Wave, Monocle, Rag Doll, Psycho-Pirate, Mist, and four villains from Earth-1 (Plant Master, Signalman, Cheetah, and Killer Frost) into a new Secret Society of Super Villains. Afterwards, the Ultra-Humanite regularly appears in DC Comics titles, opposing the All-Star Squadron in the 1940s, and the Justice Society of America and Infinity, Inc. in the decades since World War II.

Post-Crisis
After the 1985-86 limited series Crisis on Infinite Earths, Superman's history was rewritten in The Man of Steel miniseries, and the Earth-Two Superman was removed from continuity. The Ultra-Humanite was excluded from Superman's reboot, and his post-Crisis history remained tied to the 1940s and to the Justice Society of America and All-Star Squadron. Previous appearances of the Ultra-Humanite fighting Golden Age Superman in the 1940s in Action Comics #13-21 and in All-Star Squadron were re-told for the sake of continuity (a technique known as retconning) to show him having fought other 1940s heroes.

The Ultra-Humanite's most ambitious scheme occurs in the 2002 "Stealing Thunder" story arc from JSA #32-37 where, having taken over the body of an aged Johnny Thunder, he deceives Jakeem Thunder into handing over his magical pen. With the power of the near-omnipotent Thunderbolt, the Ultra-Humanite restores his body's youth, and then proceeds to take over the world. Under his rule, Earth is transformed into essentially a single mind, with nearly every metahuman becoming an extension of the Ultra-Humanite. A few heroes manage to escape the control of the Ultra-Humanite: Jakeem Thunder, Captain Marvel, Hourman, the third Crimson Avenger, Power Girl, Sand, and the second Icicle. Wildcat and Hector Hall are also free—Wildcat as an apparent side effect of his 'nine lives', and Hall so that he could summon the garb of Doctor Fate and thus provide the Ultra-Humanite with access to Nabu's power—but both are held captive by the Ultra-Humanite. After the reserve JSA are able to temporarily short out the Thunderbolt (thanks to advice from the time-displaced original Hourman), the Ultra-Humanite is seemingly killed by the Crimson Avenger (although the Icicle nearly beats her to it) as revenge for the death of the first Crimson Avenger, who died earlier in an explosion triggered by the Ultra-Humanite.

One Year Later

After the events of "Infinite Crisis", history was altered to bring Dolores Winters (now called Delores Winters) back to life via the reveal that her brain was placed in a new body after Ultra-Humanite stole her body for his own use.

The Ultra-Humanite's secret origin is revised, shedding more light on his past life as genius youth Gerard Shugel (a name derived from Superman creators Joe Shuster and Jerry Siegel). He was born with both an intellect that surpassed the world's greatest minds and a degenerative disease that was slowly eating away at him. He used his intellect to find ways to keep the disease at bay, while trying to find a way to transplant his brain into a healthy body.

Working with a reckless and young Satanna, a fellow college researcher, they worked together at their brain/transplant and animal hybridization technologies. Forced to relocate in the Democratic Republic of the Congo and beset by rebel forces and the military, Satanna transplanted the brain of Gerard into the altered body of an albino gorilla. They shared an intimate relationship for a while, then they parted ways for a long time, paving the way for their separate adventures as chronicled pre-OYL.

In the 2006-07 Lightning Saga crossover between Justice Society of America and Justice League of America, the untold story of how Ultra-Humanite transitioned from Delores Winter's body to his albino ape form was revealed: Per Degaton, the villainous time traveler, and a young version of Despero rescued the Delores Winters-version of Ultra-Humanite from a hospital in the year 1948. It is revealed that the Ultra-Humanite was stricken with terminal cancer and in exchange for his loyalty, Per Degaton agreed to provide a new body for the villain, in the form of a rare albino ape from the secret civilization known as Gorilla City. Christening themselves the "Time Stealers", they align themselves with Mister Mind, Rex Hunter, the mysterious Black Beetle, and the villainous father of Booster Gold in an attempt to manipulate time for their own selfish goals. Their conspiracy ultimately unravels at the hands of Booster Gold and Blue Beetle Ted Kord. In the end, Ultra-Humanite and Despero were sent back into the past after their group was defeated, while other members were returned to their previous places in time.

Ultra-Humanite is said to still be alive and well, having stolen a copy of Steve Dayton's Mento helmet.

Later, Ultra-Humanite is seen aiding the Reach in their plans to conquer Earth; he is defeated by Blue Beetle and Guy Gardner. Ultra appears in the first arc of Power Girl (vol. 2), using an anti-gravity mechanism to raise New York City into the air, holding the city hostage in exchange for being able to transfer his mind into Power Girl's body. The attempt fails, and Power Girl accidentally scars his whole body with acid burns, maiming his form permanently.

Satanna returns to New York, attempting to aid her former lover, stealing the body of the current Terra, Atlee, for Gerard's use. After a lengthy fight, Power Girl is able to retrieve Terra's brain (now in the crippled simian form of the Ultra-Humanite) and bring both of them to Strata, Atlee's advanced underground birth society, to get her friend restored to her proper body. Strata's scientists agree to clone a new, fully human body for Gerard Shugel, resembling a healthy version of his twenty-year-old human self, cured from his degenerative disease. Power Girl attempts to hire him as a scientist for her Starr Labs, and Gerard plays along showing a fake desire of reformation.

2010s onward
When DC rebooted its continuity with The New 52 in 2011, Ultra-Humanite was reintroduced in the pages of Action Comics with a wildly different concept: a fear-feeding alien in the Phantom Zone who manages to get out and feed on the fear of Superman when he is just a child. Young Clark is too strong for him, so he retreats to the Phantom Zone. During the "Superman: Doomed" storyline, a portal opens in Smallville allowing the Ultra-Humanite to escape. Superman is able to defeat him by filling him up with too many emotions.

Later, DC discarded most of its New 52 changes, with an initiative called "DC Rebirth". All of Superman's villains and history were restored to pre-New 52 basics in a storyline called "Superman Reborn". The original Ultra-Humanite subsequently appeared again, depicted as an evil genius who placed his brain into an albino gorilla. He is a member of the Secret Society of Super Villains.

Powers and abilities
The Ultra-Humanite possesses a supergenius intelligence, thus making him twice as smart as Luthor. He has the medical knowledge necessary to surgically transfer his brain into another body without transplant rejection, even when using variously different species. His most frequently revisited form is that of a mutated albino gorilla with immense physical attributes and psychic powers. He invented numerous advanced weapons, vehicles, and other arcane technology. 

In the New 52, this Ultra-Humanite was portrayed as an alien who feeds on a person's emotions. To help him do this, he can send out small tentacled creatures that overshadows his victim, as well as draining the fears out of him or her.

Other versions

Superman's Reign
An alternate Ultra-Humanite appears in issues three and four of the Tangent: Superman's Reign series. This version is a living weapon created by the Soviets that went out of control. He is allegedly destroyed in battle by the Tangent version of Superman, but is later revealed that he was preserved and reprogrammed to fight for the Tangent's Superman's cause. He is finally destroyed by the combined efforts of the Tangent Batman and New Earth Superman.

Legends of the DC Universe
The first three issues of Legends of the DC Universe feature the post-Crisis Superman, early in his career, battling a scientist named Morgan Wilde who, angered by the death of his wife, swears revenge on Luthor and gains the ability to transfer his "life essence" (called "Under-Light") as the U.L.T.R.A. Humanite.

The Golden Age
In the Elseworlds miniseries The Golden Age, the Ultra-Humanite places his brain into the body of Tex Thomson, known as the Americommando. He also arranges to place the brain of his ally Adolf Hitler into the body of Danny Dunbar, while simultaneously arranging to give Hitler (as Dunbar) super-powers.

Superman & Batman: Generations
The Ultra-Humanite is the principal villain in the John Byrne limited series Superman & Batman: Generations. He first appears in the 1939 story, but is believed to be killed when his escape rocket explodes. Decades later, it is revealed that the Humanite had his brain placed in the body of his lackey Lex Luthor and posed as Luthor for the intervening time. He then attempts to swap bodies with a then-powerless Superman, but is killed when Superman, attempting to escape, throws a metal spear into Humanite's computer, causing it to electrocute the villain.

Earth 2
A different Ultra-Humanite appears as the main villain of the "One Nation" arc of Earth 2: Society #12-16, where he is a survivor of the destroyed Earth 2 and uses the lost children of the old Earth as his personal soldiers, one of whom is John Grayson, the son of the Earth 2 Dick Grayson, aka Batman III. He is killed by Hawkgirl with the Amazonion Casket, the object he was going to use as part of his plan to take over Earth 2.

In other media

Television

 Ultra-Humanite in his albino gorilla body appears in Justice League, voiced by Ian Buchanan. This version is a cultured and intellectual criminal with a deep love for classical music and violent hatred for most modern art. Additionally, he is more benevolent than his comics counterpart, helping heroes for his own reasons across his appearances, with one seeing him joining Lex Luthor's Injustice Gang before eventually betraying him.
 Ultra-Humanite in his albino Tyrannosaurus body appeared in the Batman: The Brave and the Bold short "The Creature Commandos in The War That Time Forgot!", voiced by Jeff Bennett. This version is a brain in a small mobile robotic jar capable of possessing anything. While assisting the Axis Powers during World War II with mind-controlled dinosaurs from Dinosaur Island, he captured Batman, but is thwarted by the Creature Commandos and forced to retreat without the Tyrannosaurus host, only to be cornered by other dinosaurs.
 Ultra-Humanite in his albino gorilla body appears in Young Justice, with vocal effects provided by Dee Bradley Baker in season one and by Greg Weisman in season three. This version mentored Dr. Helga Jace. First appearing in the season one episode "Revelation" as a member of the Injustice League, he and his fellow Leaguers were used by the Light to throw the Justice League and the Team off their trail. As of season three, Ultra-Humanite has replaced the Brain as a leading member of the Light and acquired a speaker for his harness. 
 Ultra-Humanite in his albino gorilla body appears in the third season of Stargirl, voiced by an uncredited actor. This version is an enemy of the original Justice Society of America (JSA) and an associate of Dragon King. In the present, Ultra-Humanite forms an alliance with Icicle and Dragon King before transplanting his brain into the body of Starman (portrayed by Joel McHale) to manipulate Stargirl and her JSA into crippling themselves while Dragon King transplanted his brain into Ultra-Humanite's body for him to "defeat" as Starman alongside Jordan's son. From there, he intends to run for president as a mouthpiece for Icicle to spread his ideals. However, the JSA defeat the villains, with S.T.R.I.P.E. leaving the Ultra-Humanite brain damaged.

Video games
 Ultra-Humanite appears in DC Universe Online, voiced by Brian Jepson.
 Ultra-Humanite appears as a playable character in Lego Batman 3: Beyond Gotham, voiced by Travis Willingham.
 Ultra-Humanite appears as a playable character in Lego DC Super-Villains.

Miscellaneous
 Ultra-Humanite in his albino gorilla body appears in issue #3 of the Batman: The Brave and the Bold tie-in comic book series. Having taken several apes as hosts to avoid being mistaken for Lex Luthor, he attacks the U.S. President, only to be thwarted by Batman and Green Arrow.
 Ultra-Humanite appears in issue #19 of the Young Justice tie-in comic book series. It is revealed that this version was originally an old woman who had her brain transplanted into an albino gorilla.

Merchandise
 Ultra-Humanite received a figure in Mattel's Justice League Unlimited toyline.
 Ultra-Humanite served as the Collect and Connect figure for the fourteenth wave of the DC Universe Classics line.

See also
 List of Superman enemies

References

External links
 A biography about the Ultra-Humanite
 Ultra-Humanite at Comic Vine

Animal supervillains
Villains in animated television series
Characters created by Jerry Siegel
Characters created by Joe Shuster
Comics characters introduced in 1939
DC Comics metahumans
DC Comics animals
DC Comics characters with superhuman strength
DC Comics male supervillains
DC Comics scientists
DC Comics telekinetics
DC Comics telepaths
Earth-Two
Fictional characters with albinism
Fictional characters with slowed ageing
Fictional characters with spirit possession or body swapping abilities
Fictional characters with superhuman durability or invulnerability
Fictional human–animal hybrids
Fictional hypnotists and indoctrinators
Fictional inventors
Fictional mad scientists
Fictional surgeons
Golden Age supervillains
Gorilla characters in comics
Superman characters

de:Schurken im Superman-Universum#Ultra-Humanite